Charles Eugene Hasson (July 20, 1915 – July 30, 2003) was a Major League Baseball first baseman during parts of the  and  seasons for the Philadelphia Athletics.

He is one of 133 Major League ballplayers to hit a home run in their first ever Major League at-bat, as of February 2023.

See also
Home run in first Major League at-bat

External links

1915 births
2003 deaths
Major League Baseball infielders
Philadelphia Athletics players
Minor league baseball managers
Baseball players from Pennsylvania
People from Connellsville, Pennsylvania
Nashville Vols players